This is a list of Cornell Big Red football players in the NFL Draft.

Key

Selections

References

Cornell

Cornell Big Red NFL Draft